Fremont Lakes State Recreation Area (SRA) is a state park in eastern Nebraska, United States. The recreation area is managed by the Nebraska Game and Parks Commission.

The area is popular in eastern Nebraska for fishing, camping, and swimming. The area includes 20 lakes. Powerboating is allowed on lakes 10, 15 and 20. All other lakes are open to non-power craft and electric trolling motors only. The most common fish found within the area are Largemouth bass, bluegill, crappie and channel catfish. There are 202 RV campsites with electrical hookups and 240 primitive campsites.

See also
Nebraska Game and Parks Commission

References

External links
 Fremont Lakes State Recreation Area
 Nebraska Game and Parks Commission

Protected areas of Nebraska
State parks of Nebraska